Antonio Acevedo Hernández (8 March 1886 – 1 December 1962) was a Chilean writer. Hernández was a self-taught novelist, playwright and writer whose works include theater, novels, short stories, literary and journalistic chronicles, essays, poetry and popular Chilean folklore. He created over 840 works, including the plays Almas perdidas, El Vino triste, La Sangre, and El Rancho. He was awarded the Premio Nacional de Teatro in 1936. His work, along with that of authors like Germán Luco Cruchaga and Armando Moock, marked the beginnings of Chilean dramaturgy.

Biography
Hernández was the son of Juan Acevedo Astorga (one of the soldiers of the War of the Pacific) and Maria Hernández Urbistondo. After having spent his early years in Tracacura, he moved to Temuco. When he was a little over 10 years, he went into the woods in the area, where loggers taught him mastery of weapons. He was illiterate until he moved to the city of Chillán, where he entered the Escuela Taller, studying the art of carpentry. However, his precarious economic situation forced him to work carrying out multiple trades (woodcutter, charger, vendor fairs and carpenter). He stayed in school for a year and learned to read and write.

Career
At sixteen years old Hernández decided to move to Santiago. To achieve this, he walked four days without eating until reaching Linares, where an acquaintance of his father gave him a passage to the capital. At that time, in Santiago the 900 literary generation flourished, which involved important Chilean literary figures such as: Pedro Antonio González, Carlos Pezoa Veliz, Fernando Santiván, Pedro Prado and Juan D'Halmar. However, Hernández did not become linked so much with this generation as with the movement driven by Luis Emilio Recabarren.

As a result of the commitment he made with this social movement, in 1903 he participated in the port strike in Valparaíso, then, in a railway strike in Caleta Abarca, and another in 1905, in the capital. It was within these movements that he met, in 1913, Domingo Gómez Rojas, who read his work and was excited to present it in theaters. This would be the initial step in a progressive massification of his dramaturgy.

While writing and offering his works to theaters, he had to continue working as a clerk in stores, at the Civil Registry and even doing some boxing matches. However, he was afterwards hired by the Pellicer theater company to sweep dressing rooms, run errands for artists, to be a prompter, vigilante, "text arranger", or whatever was needed. From then on, every year his productions increased, as well as the advancement of the Chilean theater in the country.

Death
His difficult years and arteriosclerosis caused him to gradually lose his mental faculties until his death.
Sus funerales fueron grandiosos. Lo único grandioso que tuvo en su vida. Masas de gentes se apostaron en las calles y arrojaron flores al paso del féretro. Despidieron sus restos en el Campo Santo representantes de todas las condiciones políticas y ramas sociales, recibiendo así su cuerpo sin vida los honores de los más grandes, de aquellos que muchas veces quisieron negarle el derecho a la vida. 

 His funeral was grandiose. The only grandeur that there was in his life. Masses of people were stationed on the streets and threw flowers as his coffin passed. Representatives of all the political and social branches bid goodbye to his remains in the Campo Santo, thereby his lifeless body received the greatest honors, of those who often wanted to deny him the right to life.

Work
Hernández's work sought, first, to abandon the frequent imitation of theater performances that were in vogue at the time (operettas and light comedies, among others), so his background was often autobiographical. His proletarian reality formed the cornerstone of each of his creations. Therefore, most of his works speak about exploitation, marginalization, alcoholism, violence, and social problems of farmers, miners, laborers and manufacturers. His texts were influenced by both the folklore and popular religion, as well as by his own, often intuitive, reading of texts, ranging from the classics, to productions framed in ideological currents of socialism and anarchism. Acevedo Hernández ventured into this kind of socially engaged theater before the publication of El teatro político (The political theater) by Erwin Piscator in 1929 and El pequeño Organón (Little Organon) by Bertolt Brecht in 1948.

The police force intervened in performances of his works repeatedly, either by censorship or because they caused unrest within the theater; on one occasion, during the premiere of Los deportados (The deportees) in 1931, someone from the audience shot an actor who was portraying a cop.

Works
 Almas Perdidas (1917). Three-act comedy (1918).
 Piedra Azul (1920). Novel.
 La Canción Rota (1921). Novel
 La raza fuerte (1924).
 la hija de todos (1926).
 Arból Viejo (1927). Three-act comedy
 Caín (1927). Biblical
 Manuel Luceño (1927). Adventure Novel.
 Camino de flores (1929).
 De pura cepa (1929).
 Croquis chilenos (1931). Editorial Zig – Zag.
 Las Santiaguinas (1931).
 Por el atajo (1932). Dramatic comedy in four acts.
 La canción rota (1933). Three-act drama.
 Los cantores populares chilenos (1933). Editorial.
 Cardo negro (1933). Three-act comedy.
 Angélica (1934).  Three-act comedy.
 El libro de la tierra chilena (1935).
 Joaquín Murieta (1936). Six-act drama.
 Chanarcillo (1937).
 Las aventuras del roto Juan (1938).
 Algo de lo que Ud. ha cantado y canta (1939).
 Canciones populares chilenas (1939).
 La leyenda de la felicidad (1943). Editorial Zig – Zag.
 Pedro Urdemales (1947). Novel. Cultural editorial.
 Leyendas chilenas (1952). Editorial.
 La cueca: orígenes, historia y antología (1953). Editorial.
 Retablo pintoresco de Chile (1953).
 El triángulo tiene cuatro lados (1963).

Sources
 Enciclopedia Temática de Chile (Thematic Encyclopedia of Chile) – Ercilla – Grandes Personajes de la Historia (Great personalities in History)
 Memoria Chilena
 La Escena Chilena (The University of Chile)
 Chile Escena (The Pontifical Catholic University of Chile)
 Logos Library

References

Chilean male novelists
1886 births
1962 deaths
Chilean male dramatists and playwrights
20th-century Chilean dramatists and playwrights
20th-century Chilean male writers
20th-century Chilean novelists
20th-century Chilean short story writers
20th-century Chilean non-fiction writers
Chilean male short story writers
Chilean essayists